K. Kandasamy is an Indian politician and former Member of Parliament of India from Thiruchengode Constituency.

References 

All India Anna Dravida Munnetra Kazhagam politicians
India MPs 1996–1997
Lok Sabha members from Tamil Nadu
Tamil Maanila Congress politicians
People from Namakkal district
Tamil Nadu MLAs 1991–1996
Year of birth missing
Possibly living people